There are two species of skink named Cameron Highlands forest skink, both endemic to Malaysia:
 Sphenomorphus cameronicus
 Tytthoscincus jaripendek